Hollywood Land is a themed land at Disney California Adventure park at the Disneyland Resort in Anaheim, California.  The area is inspired by the 1930s Golden Age period of Hollywood and hosts attractions themed to this concept, including a backlot of a typical Hollywood studio.  The land opened as Hollywood Pictures Backlot with the park in 2001.

The land's entrance once had towering studio gates that featured intricately carved elephants atop massive columns. The gateway was a tribute to the spectacular epics made throughout Hollywood history, especially pioneering director D. W. Griffith's 1916 silent film Intolerance. After the park's re-design, the archway sign, elephants and columns were removed, whereas the repainted pedestals remained.

Attractions include the Hyperion Theater, which opened with the park in 2001 and has hosted four productions, the 3D film Mickey's PhilharMagic, Monsters, Inc. Mike & Sulley to the Rescue!, based on the Disney·Pixar film Monsters, Inc., which opened in 2006 as part of the resort's Happiest Homecoming on Earth, the Animation Academy.The Red Car Trolley attraction, based on the Pacific Electric Railway, which runs through the streets of Hollywood Land but is part of Buena Vista Street officially. Former attractions include Muppet*Vision 3D, Disney Junior – Live on Stage! (formerly known as Playhouse Disney – Live on Stage!) and The Twilight Zone Tower of Terror, Superstar Limo, and Guardians of the Galaxy - Mission: Breakout! (which is now part of Avengers Campus).

Attractions and entertainment
 Disney Animation
 Animation Academy
 Character Close-Up
 Sorcerer's Workshop
 Turtle Talk with Crush
 Disney Theater
 Disney Junior Dance Party!
 Hyperion Theater (Currently empty)
 Rogers the Musical – one-act production of the fictional Broadway musical based around the Marvel Cinematic Universe's version of Captain America that was first introduced in the Disney+ series Hawkeye, to be performed for a limited time beginning in mid-2023
 The Hollywood Backlot Stage (currently empty)
 Mickey's PhilharMagic at the Sunset Showcase Theater
 Monsters, Inc. Mike & Sulley to the Rescue!

Former attractions and entertainment
 Disney Animation Building
 Animation Screening Room
 Art of Disney Animation
 The Hyperion Theater
 Disney's Aladdin: A Musical Spectacular at the Hyperion Theater (2003-2016)
 Frozen - Live at the Hyperion at the Hyperion Theater (2016-2020)
Superstar Limo (2001-2002)
Who Wants to Be a Millionaire - Play It! (Stage 17) (2001-2004)
 Sunset Showcase Theater
 Muppet*Vision 3D (2001-2014)
 For the First Time in Forever: A Frozen Sing-Along Celebration (2015-2016)
 ElecTRONica (2010-2012)
 Mad T Party (2012-2014;2015-2016)
 The Twilight Zone Tower of Terror (2004-2017)
 Disney Theater
ABC Soap Opera Bistro (2001-2002)
 Disney Junior – Live on Stage! (2003-2010; 2011-2017), (formerly known as Playhouse Disney – Live on Stage!)
 Avengers Training Initiative (2017)

Restaurants and refreshments
 Award Wieners
 Fairfax Market
 Schmoozies
 Studio Catering Co. (formerly ''Between Takes') 
 Studio Bar
 (SEASONAL) DCA Food & Wine Festival

Former restaurants and refreshments
 Hollywood & Dine
 Drink Me

Shops
Disneyland Resort Backlot Premiere Shop
Gone Hollywood
Off The Page
Studio Store

Former Shops
The Collector’s Warehouse (now part of Avengers Campus)
Rizzo's Prop & Pawn Shop
Wandering Oaken's Trading Post
Tower Hotel Gifts

Characters
 Princess Sofia
 Doc McStuffins
 Anna
 Elsa
 Kristoff
 Olaf

Former characters
 Bear (Bear in the Big Blue House)
 Olie Polie and Zowie Polie (Rolie Polie Olie)
 Stanley
 JoJo and Goliath the Lion (JoJo's Circus)
 Handy Manny

Gallery

References 

 
Disney California Adventure
Themed areas in Walt Disney Parks and Resorts